The 10/40 Window is a term coined by Christian missionary strategist and Partners International CEO Luis Bush in 1990 to refer to those regions of the eastern hemisphere, plus the European and African part of the western hemisphere, located between 10 and 40 degrees north of the equator, a general area that was purported to have the highest level of socioeconomic challenges and least access to the Christian message and Christian resources on the planet.

The concept behind the 10/40 Window highlights these three elements (as of data available in 1990): an area of the world with great poverty and low quality of life, combined with lack of access to Christian resources and unreached non-Christians. The Window forms a band encompassing Saharan and Northern Africa, as well as almost all of Asia (West Asia, Central Asia, South Asia, East Asia and much of Southeast Asia). Roughly two-thirds of the world population lived in the 10/40 Window, and it is predominantly Muslim, Hindu, Buddhist, animist, Jewish, or atheist.  Many governments in the 10/40 Window are officially or unofficially opposed to Christian missionary work of any kind within their borders.

Origin
This region of the world was previously known to Christians as the "resistant belt", as noted by Luis Bush at the 1989 Lausanne II Conference in Manila. In 1990, Bush's research led to a meeting with Pete Holzmann, a leader of the team developing the first PC-based GIS software. They analyzed the region using a box between 10 and 40 degrees north latitude and called it the 10/40 box. A few weeks later, Bush and his wife Doris were inspired to rename it the 10/40 Window, stating that this region ought to be seen as a "window of opportunity". The analysis and concept was a generalization that focuses on a region, not a sharp boundary defining what is a priority, and what is not. For this reason, many missiologists prefer to use the phrase 10/40 Window region.

Before being called the "resistant belt", the Islamic portions of this region, as well as selected unreached Buddhist and Hindu areas, were referred to as the "unoccupied fields" by Samuel Zwemer, in his book by that same title, published in 1911.

Controversy
Some researchers have objected to such a broad-brush term which seems to imply a unifying characteristic of the 10/40 Window when in fact no large area of the planet is completely homogenous in cultural attributes.

The 1990 research data states:
 this part of the world was home to the largest populations living in deep poverty and lowest quality of life;
 this part of the world did have least access to Christian resources. Note the emphasis on access not percent Christian. The West has ubiquitous access to such resources; this area of the world did and does not.

This research deals in overall population characteristics. The 10/40 Window is a term that helps people visualize the general area of the analysis, where the above characteristics are generally true, but with exceptions proving it is only a generalization. Some examples of the exceptions:
 The 10/40 Window article refers to the "poorest of the poor" living in that region (based on late-1980s per-capita GNP under US$  500). Of the three billion people living in such poverty-stricken nations, 82% lived in the 10/40 Window.  Yet the 10/40 Window also includes nations such as South Korea and Japan. In the late 20th century, Japan boasted the world's third largest economy, and South Korea the eleventh. Such nations were strong throughout the late 20th century.
 Geographically, the 10/40 Window includes the Philippines and Portugal, which both have a Roman Catholic Christian majority; Greece, where almost 98% of the population belonged to the Greek Orthodox Church; Cyprus, where Christianity accounts for over 70% of the population;    South Korea, which is home to the largest single congregation church in the world and is also the second largest missionary-sending nation in the world; and Ethiopia, which is a majority-Christian country.  The 10/40 Window does not encompass Indonesia or Sri Lanka, nations that had very little access to Christian resources.

To address these concerns the list of 10/40 countries has been amended in recent years to omit Greece, Portugal and the Philippines.

Gaining widespread use
Over the years, the 10/40 Window has evolved from a specialist term used by Christian missiologists to assumed vocabulary for Christians in the West.  It is an emerging term in the secular press and can be found in press style glossaries. Non-western writers and organizations also refer to the 10/40 Window. In addition, those opposed to the idea of evangelism make use of the term.

Analysis
The original 1990 GIS 10/40 Window analysis produced several insights, among them showing that the nations of the 10/40 Window represented (as of the research date):
82% of the poorest of the world's poor (per capita GNP less than US$500 per year),
84% of those with lowest quality of life (life expectancy, infant mortality, and literacy),
the hub of the world's major non-Christian religions (Islam, Buddhism, Hinduism, etc.,)
close to 100% of those who were both most-poor and had least-access to Christian resources (two-dimensional analysis)
The least Christian resource investment and least sharing of the Christian message

The GIS analysis utilized country-level data from the Operation World almanac, the World Christian Encyclopedia, and the World Factbook.

Non-Christians in the 10/40 Window by religion
The first edition GIS analysis maps highlighted the three major religious blocks in the 10/40 Window, specifically the majority Muslim, Hindu and Buddhist nations. Population estimates at the time for the year 2000 (from Operation World) were given as:
 28 Muslim countries, 1.1 billion population est. (2000)
 2 Hindu countries, 1.1 billion population est. (2000)
 8 Buddhist countries, 237 million population est. (2000)

Later updates have been based more on census data and other estimates rather than forward-looking population estimates. The cited reference provides the following estimate of "unreached" non-Christian populations in the 10/40 Window:
865 million Muslims
550 million Hindus
275 million Buddhists
140 million in 2550 tribal groups (mainly animist)
17 million Jews

Nations in the 10/40 Window
The 10/40 Window originally encompassed the following 54 countries. An expanded list including some important nearby nations is offered by the Joshua Project:

 Afghanistan
 Algeria
 Bahrain
 Bangladesh
 Benin
 Bhutan
 Burkina Faso
 Cambodia
 Chad
 China
 Cyprus
 Djibouti
 Egypt
 Eritrea
 Ethiopia
 Gambia
 Guinea
 Guinea-Bissau
 India
 Iran
 Iraq
 Israel
 Japan
 Jordan
 Korea (North)
 Korea (South)
 Kuwait
 Laos
 Lebanon
 Libya
 Mali
 Malta
 Mauritania
 Morocco
 Myanmar
 Nepal
 Niger
 Oman
 Pakistan
 Qatar
 Saudi Arabia
 Senegal
 Sudan (at the time including South Sudan)
 Syria
 Taiwan
 Tajikistan
 Thailand
 Tunisia
 Turkey
 Turkmenistan
 United Arab Emirates
 Vietnam
 Western Sahara
 Yemen

These were all Old World nations (mostly in the eastern hemisphere) with at least 50 percent of their land area falling within 10 to 40 degrees latitude as of 1990. (The list also included Gibraltar and Macau, which are not independent nations.)

See also
 Child evangelism movement
 Human Development Index which followed from the Quality of Life Index used in the 10/40 Window research

Notes

References

Bibliography

External links
Updated statistics, including some relating to 10/40 Window, SNU.
10/40 Window Maps, GMI.  Updated data from the original GIS analysis

Christian missions
Evangelical Christian missions
Geographical neologisms
Religion and geography